Ukawsaw Gronniosaw (c. 1705 – 28 September 1775), also known as James Albert, was an enslaved African man who is considered the first published African in Britain. Gronniosaw is known for his 1772 narrative autobiography A Narrative of the Most Remarkable Particulars in the Life of James Albert Ukawsaw Gronniosaw, an African Prince, as Related by Himself, which was the first slave narrative published in England. His autobiography recounted his early life in present-day Nigeria, his enslavement, and his eventual emancipation.

Life 
Gronniosaw was born in Bornu (now north-eastern Nigeria) in 1705. He said that he was doted on as the grandson of the king of Zaara. At the age of 15, he was taken by a Gold Coast ivory merchant and sold to a Dutch captain for two yards of check cloth. He was bought by an American in Barbados, who took him to New York and resold him for £50 to "Mr. Freelandhouse, a very gracious, good Minister." Freelandhouse is presumed to be the Dutch Reformed Church minister, Theodorus Jacobus Frelinghuysen, based in New Jersey.

There Gronniosaw was taught to read and was brought up as a Christian. Gronniosaw said in his autobiography that he wanted to return to his family in Africa, but Frelinghuysen denied this request and told him to focus on the Christian faith. During his time with Frelinghuysen, Gronniosaw attempted suicide, distressed by his perceived failings as a Christian. When the minister died, he freed Gronniosaw in his will. The young man worked for the minister's widow, and subsequently their orphans, but all died within four years.

Planning to go to England, where he expected to meet other pious people like the Frelinghuysens, Gronniosaw travelled to the Caribbean, where he enlisted as a cook with a privateer, and later as a soldier in the 28th Regiment of Foot to earn money for the journey. He served in Martinique and Cuba, before obtaining his discharge and sailing to England.

At first he settled in Portsmouth, but, when his landlady swindled him out of most of his savings, was forced to seek his fortune in London. There he married a young English widow, Betty, a weaver. She already had a child and bore him at least two more. She lost her job because of the financial depression and industrial unrest, and moved to Colchester. There they were saved from starvation by Osgood Hanbury (a Quaker lawyer and grandfather of the abolitionist Thomas Fowell Buxton), who employed Gronniosaw in building work. Moving to Norwich, Gronniosaw and his family again fell on hard times, as the building trades were largely seasonal. Once again, they were saved by the kindness of a Quaker, Henry Gurney (coincidentally, the grandfather of Fowell Buxton's wife, Hannah Gurney) who paid their rent arrears. A daughter died and was refused burial by the local clergy on the grounds that she was not baptised. One minister at last offered to allow her to be buried in the churchyard, but he would not read the burial service.

After pawning all their possessions, the family moved to Kidderminster, where Betty supported them by working again as a weaver. On Christmas Day 1771, Gronniosaw had their remaining children, Mary Albert (aged six), Edward Albert (aged four), and newborn Samuel Albert, baptised in the Old Independent Meeting House in Kidderminster by Benjamin Fawcett, a Dissenting minister and associate of Selina Hastings, Countess of Huntingdon and a major figure in Calvinistic Methodism. At around the same time, Gronniosaw received a letter and a charitable donation from Hastings herself. On 3 January 1772, he responded by thanking her for her 'favour', which arrived 'at a time of great necessity', and explained that he had just returned from 'Mrs Marlowe's' in nearby Leominster, 'were I was shewed kindness to from my Christian friends'. On 25 June 1774, Gronniosaw's fifth child, James Albert junior was baptised, again by Fawcett.

Shortly after his arrival in Kidderminster, Gronniosaw began work on his life story, with the help of an amanuensis from Leominster, possibly the 'Mrs Marlowe' he had mentioned in his letter to Hastings. Gronniosaw's Narrative has been studied by scholars as a groundbreaking work by an African in English. It is the first known slave narrative published in England and received wide attention, with multiple printings and editions at the time.

Gronniosaw's Narrative concludes with its author still living in Kidderminster, having "appear[ed] to be turn'd sixty"; for a long time, nothing was known of his later life. However, at some point during the late twentieth century, an obituary for Gronniosaw was discovered in the Chester Chronicle. The article, from 2 October 1775, reads:On Thursday [28 September] died, in this city, aged 70, James Albert Ukawsaw Gronniosaw, an African Prince, of Zaara. He left his country in the early part of his life, with a view to acquire proper notions of the Divine Being, and of the worship due to Him. He met with many trials and embarrassments, was much afflicted and persecuted. His last moments exhibited that chearful [sic] serenity which, at such a time, is the certain effect of a thorough conviction of the great truths of Christianity. He published a narrative of his life.

The burial register for the Church of England parish church of St Oswald, Chester - a church which occupied the south transept of Chester Cathedral from 1448 to 1881 - includes an entry from 28 September 1775 for "James Albert (a Blackm[an])", giving his age as 70. Gronniosaw's grave has not been identified.

The autobiography

Gronniosaw's autobiography was produced in Kidderminster in 1772. It is entitled A Narrative of the Most remarkable Particulars in the Life of James Albert Ukawsaw Gronniosaw, an African Prince, As related by himself. The title page explains that it was "committed to paper by the elegant pen of a young LADY of the town of LEOMINSTER." It is the first slave narrative by an African in the English language, a genre related to the literature of enslaved persons who later gained freedom. Published in Bath, Somerset, in December 1772, it gives a vivid account of Gronniosaw's life, from his leaving home to his enslavement in Africa by a native king, through a period of being enslaved, to his struggles with poverty as a free man in Colchester and Kidderminster. He was attracted to this last town because it was at one time the home of Richard Baxter, a 17th-century Nonconformist minister whom Gronniosaw had learned to admire.

The preface was written by the Reverend Walter Shirley, cousin to Selina Hastings, Countess of Huntingdon, who was a patron of the Calvinist wing of Methodism. He interprets Gronniosaw's experience of enslavement and his being transported from Bornu to New York as an example of Calvinist predestination and election.

Scholar Henry Louis Gates Jr. has noted that Gronniosaw's narrative was different from later slave narratives, which generally criticised slavery as an institution. In his account, Gronniosaw referred to his "white-skinned sister," said that he had been willing to leave Africa because his family believed in many deities instead of one almighty God (which he learned more about under Christianity), and suggested that he became happier as he assimilated to white English society, through clothing but mostly via language. In addition, he described another black servant at his master's house as a "devil." Gates has concluded that the narrative does not have an anti-slavery view, as was ubiquitous in subsequent slave narratives.

Until the recent discovery of the 1775 obituary and a manuscript letter written by Gronniosaw to Hastings, the Narrative was the only significant source of information for his life.

See also
Black British elite, the class Gronniosaw belonged to.

References

Notes

Additional sources
Echero, Michael. "Theologizing 'Underneath the Tree': an African topos in Ukawsaw Gronniosaw, William Blake, and William Cole". Research in African Literatures. 23.4 (Winter 1992). 51–58.
Harris, Jennifer. "Seeing the Light: Re-Reading James Albert Ukawsaw Gronniosaw". English Language Notes 42.4, 2005: 43–57.

External links
 
 
 
 A Narrative of the Most Remarkable Particulars in the Life of James Albert Ukawsaw Gronniosaw, an African Prince, as Related by Himself, Bath: Printed by W. Gye, 1770.

1710 births
1775 deaths
18th-century American slaves
18th-century Nigerian people
Barbadian slaves
Black British former slaves
Black British history
Black British writers
British autobiographers
Converts to Protestantism from pagan religions
American freedmen
Nigerian autobiographers
Nigerian emigrants to the United States
Nigerian expatriates in the United Kingdom
People who wrote slave narratives